Edateku Island is one of the islands of Amami Islands of Satsunan Islands, Japan. It administratively belongs to Uken Village, Ōshima District, Kagoshima Prefecture. It is a desert island far off the Amami Oshima coast. It is said to be an origin of Achalinus werneri, a kind of colubrid snake species.

The island was originally planned to be an oil reserve site in 1970s, but this plan was finally called off as it was strongly opposed by nearby villagers.

See also

 Desert island
 List of islands

References

 
Islands of Kagoshima Prefecture
Satsunan Islands
Uninhabited islands of Japan